Voskresenovka is the name of several rural localities in Russia:
Voskresenovka, Bryansk Oblast, a village in Bryansk Oblast
Voskresenovka, Jewish Autonomous Oblast, a selo in the Jewish Autonomous Oblast
Voskresenovka, Kursky District, Kursk Oblast, a village in Kursk Oblast
Voskresenovka (station), Mikhaylovsky District, Amur Oblast, station in the Mikhaylovsky District of Amur Oblast, Russia